Glyphodes extorris is a moth in the family Crambidae. It was described by Paul Dognin in 1905. It is found in Peru and Colombia.

References

Moths described in 1905
Glyphodes